Raymond Demorest Little (January 5, 1880 – July 29, 1932) was an American tennis player. He was ranked in the U.S. Top 10 eleven times between 1900 and 1912, his highest ranking coming in 1907 when he was ranked No. 4. He played on the United States Davis Cup team, and also won the intercollegiate tennis title for Princeton University in 1900.

Biography
Little was born on January 5, 1880. His father was Joseph J. Little, an English-born Democratic Party member of Congress, publishing executive, and civil war veteran.

He attended Princeton University, where he was the president of Colonial Club. He was also captain for the Princeton Tigers men's ice hockey team in 1901.

At the tournament now known as the Cincinnati Masters, the oldest tournament in the U.S. played in its original city, Little reached 12 finals in eight appearances between 1900 and 1907: four singles finals, six doubles finals and two mixed doubles finals. In those 12 finals appearances, his only loss came in the singles final of 1903, when he was defeated by Kreigh Collins, an outstanding player out of Chicago.

Little's three singles titles came in 1900, 1901 and 1902, his six doubles titles were in 1900, 1901, 1904, 1905, 1906 & 1907, and his mixed doubles titles came in 1901 with Marion Jones Farquhar and 1905 with May Sutton.

Little won the 1900 American intercollegiate singles tennis championship as a student at Princeton University. At the U.S. National Championships he paired with Gus Touchard to win the 1911 doubles title and reach the 1912 doubles final. He also reached the doubles final in 1900, 1904 and 1908. Little reached the semifinals of the singles in 1901 (beating William Clothier before losing to Beals Wright) and 1906 (beating Harold Hackett before losing to Karl Behr).

He committed suicide on July 29, 1932.

Grand Slam finals

Doubles (1 title, 4 runner-ups)

Mixed doubles (1 title, 2 runner-ups)

References

External links
 
 
 

1880 births
1932 suicides
19th-century American people
19th-century male tennis players
American male tennis players
Princeton Tigers men's tennis players
Tennis people from New York (state)
Grand Slam (tennis) champions in mixed doubles
Grand Slam (tennis) champions in men's doubles
United States National champions (tennis)
Suicides in New York City